Nico Tortorella (born July 30, 1988) is an American actor and model, known for roles in filmsincluding Scream 4, the Fox crime drama series The Following (2013–2015), and the TV Land comedy-drama series Younger (2015–2021). From 2020 to 2021, they also played Felix Carlucci on the AMC series The Walking Dead: World Beyond.

Life and career
Tortorella is a native of Wilmette, Illinois, and a graduate of New Trier High School. They are of Italian descent. In May 2009, The CW ordered a 13-episode first season of the drama series The Beautiful Life: TBL. The series centered on a group of models sharing a residence in New York City and Tortorella portrayed the role of an up-and-coming underwear model Cole Shepard. The series premiered on September 16, 2009, to mixed reviews from critics. The CW cancelled the series after its second episode due to low ratings.

In June 2009, Tortorella was announced to star in the ABC Family teen drama television series Make It or Break It, where they took on the role of Razor, an aspiring singer. Tortorella temporarily left the series to pursue work on The Beautiful Life and, after that series' cancellation, returned to Make It or Break It in a recurring role. In August 2010, Tortorella made a special guest appearance in the episode "If Only..." which marked their final appearance on the series. That year, Tortorella also had a small role in the Joel Schumacher film Twelve.

In June 2010, Tortorella was announced to star in the horror film Scream 4, the fourth installment of the Scream film series. They portrayed Trevor Sheldon, a Woodsboro teenager whose life is in danger when school peers are killed off one by one. Tortorella next appeared on the Fox serial killer drama The Following. The show was created by Kevin Williamson, who also wrote Scream 4. In 2014, Tortorella was cast as Josh, Sutton Foster's character Liza's younger lover in the TV Land comedy-drama Younger, created by Darren Star. Their first leading film role was in the 2015 independent film Hunter&Game, in which they played hard-partying electronic musician Carson Lowe, which they described as a "role I was meant to play." The film premiered at the LA Indie Film Fest in October 2014, where it won Best Feature and Best Director of a Feature Awards. The film had its East Coast premiere at the Art of Brooklyn Film Festival in May 2015, where it won the Best Feature award.

In September 2016, Tortorella launched the podcast The Love Bomb on the At Will Radio podcast network. On May 1, 2018, Tortorella and Matteo Lane were featured on a Nancy podcast.

In April 2020, Tortorella competed in RuPaul's Secret Celebrity Drag Race.

Personal life
Speaking to the New York Posts Page Six in June 2016, Tortorella declared themself sexually fluid and identified as bisexual in an October 2016 interview with Vulture. In November 2017, Tortorella and Bethany C. Meyers (who they had been dating for 11 years) talked about being in a polyamorous relationship, a revelation that got them uninvited from their respective families' Thanksgiving dinners. Nico is also demisexual.

Tortorella civilly married Meyers on March 9, 2018, at a Manhattan City clerk's office before exchanging vows at St. Paul's Chapel. Tortorella announced that they are gender fluid during a video collaboration with drag queen Trinity The Tuck in the same year. Tortorella uses they/them pronouns.

Filmography

Film

Television

Music videos

Note

References

External links
 

1988 births
Living people
21st-century American actors
American film actors
American television actors
American non-binary actors
American bisexual actors
LGBT models
LGBT people from Illinois
Actors from Illinois
Models from Illinois
New Trier High School alumni
Non-binary models
People from Wilmette, Illinois
Polyamorous people
Bisexual non-binary people
Sexually fluid people
Genderfluid people
Demisexual people